Dwight and Sears won the title by defeating Newbold and Van Rensselaer in the final.

Draw

References 
 

Men's Doubles
U.S. National Championships (tennis) by year – Men's doubles